Neusticurus is a genus of gymnophthalmid lizards endemic to northern South America. They are often found near streams and are semi-aquatic. Some species formerly included in this genus are now placed in Potamites, which also are semi-aquatic inhabitants of South America.

Species
Seven species are recognized as being valid.

Neusticurus arekuna 
Neusticurus bicarinatus  - two-faced neusticurus
Neusticurus medemi  - Medem's neusticurus
Neusticurus racenisi  - Roze's neusticurus, common Venezuelan water teiid 
Neusticurus rudis  - red neusticurus
Neusticurus surinamensis  - red neusticurus
Neusticurus tatei  - Tate's neusticurus

Nota bene: A binomial authority in parentheses indicates that the species was originally described in a genus other than Neusticurus.

References

Further reading
Boulenger GA (1885). Catalogue of the Lizards in the British Museum (Natural History). Second Edition. Volume II. ... Teiidæ ... London: Trustees of the British Museum (Natural History). (Taylor and Francis, printers). xiii + 497 pp. + Plates I-XXIV. (Genus Neusticurus, p. 381).
Duméril AMC, Bibron G (1839). Erpétologie générale ou Histoire naturelle complète des Reptiles. Tome cinquième [=General Herpetology or Complete Natural History of the Reptiles. Volume 5]. Paris: Roret. viii + 854 pp. (Neusticurus, new genus, pp. 61–64). (in French).

 
Lizard genera
Taxa named by André Marie Constant Duméril
Taxa named by Gabriel Bibron